Tatiana Ogryzko (born 28 May 1976 in Minsk, Belarus) is a Belarusian former individual rhythmic gymnast.

Biography 

In 1992, Ogrizko was involved in a car accident which left her in a coma for six months. She had to learn to walk again. One year later, she participated at the World Championships in Alicante in 1993, sharing the gold medal in the ribbon competition with Maria Petrova of Bulgaria.

She participated at the 1996 Olympic Games, and ranked 6th in the AA semi-finals and 8th in the AA finals.

She retired at age 21 in 1997.

Ogrizko is currently a coach and judge for the Belarusian Gymnastics Federation. She and her former teammate, Larissa Loukianenko, are currently coaching Melitina Staniouta.

References

External links
 

1976 births
Living people
Belarusian rhythmic gymnasts
Gymnasts from Minsk
Medalists at the Rhythmic Gymnastics World Championships
Universiade medalists in gymnastics
Universiade gold medalists for Belarus
Universiade silver medalists for Belarus
Universiade bronze medalists for Belarus
Medalists at the 1997 Summer Universiade